Letícia Helena de Queiroz Colin (born 30 December 1989) is a Brazilian actress and singer. In 2022, she was nominated for the International Emmy Award for Best Actress for her role in the series Onde Está Meu Coração.

Filmography

Film

Television

Stage

Internet

Participation in video clips

Discography

Single

Awards and nominations

References

External links

 

1989 births
Living people
Actresses from Santo André
Brazilian television actresses
Brazilian television presenters
Brazilian stage actresses
Brazilian film actresses
People from Santo André, São Paulo
Brazilian Buddhists
Converts to Sōka Gakkai
Members of Sōka Gakkai
Nichiren Buddhists
21st-century Brazilian singers
21st-century Brazilian women singers
Brazilian women television presenters